Nosotek is the first Western-invested IT joint venture company in North Korea. Nosotek was founded in 2008 by the North Korean General Federation of Science and Technology (GFST) and the foreign entrepreneurs Felix Abt and Volker Eloesser.

Nosotek is known for developing computer games for various platforms, such as iPhone, j2me and Wii. In 2012, Nosotek cooperated with students from the Kim Chaek University of Technology to develop Pyongyang Racer, a racing video game released by the Koryo Tours travel agency to promote tourism in North Korea.

Nosotek's main target market is Europe, but there also have been rumors that Nosotek also has been developing games for the US based News Corporation.

References

External links 

 Archived official website
 Computerworld.com - The world's most unusual outsourcing destination
 North Korean Economy Watch - German Entrepreneur in DPRK
 
 CNN on North Korea as outsourcing hub: Interview with Volker Eloesser, CEO of Nosotek

Information technology companies of North Korea
Video game development companies